Menq Enq Ays Sarerệ, or by its English title We and our Mountains, is the debut album by Armenian folk singers Inga and Anush.

Track listing

External links 
 
Listen to the album online

2003 debut albums